Tolka Valley Park is a public park on the River Tolka, spanning the suburbs of Ashtown, Finglas and Glasnevin, in Dublin, Ireland.

Some of park's wooded areas were planted in 2011, while the wetland sections of the park were developed in 1999. These "integrated constructed wetlands" were built at the confluence between the Finglaswood Stream and River Tolka, and designed to improve water quality and reduce pollution in the watercourse. Sections of the River Tolka, within the park, have been stocked with salmon and trout.

There are sports pitches, a par-3 municipal golf course, and a pitch and putt course on the site. As of 2018, it was reported that some of the park's sports pitches had been damaged by "scrambler bikes", with issues of anti-social behaviour sometimes reported in the area.

The eastern section of Tolka Valley Park, within the Dublin City Council authority area, spans westward from the Finglas Road in Glasnevin via Finglas to Ashtown. A further section, sometimes referred to as "Tolka Valley Linear Park" or "Tolka Valley Regional Park", extends into the Fingal County Council authority area, westwards from Blanchardstown to Mulhuddart.

References 

Parks in Dublin (city)
Parks in Fingal
Finglas
Glasnevin